Chalcophora liberta, known generally as the northeastern sculptured pine borer or smaller flat-headed pine borer, is a species of metallic wood-boring beetle in the family Buprestidae.

References

Further reading

 
 
 

Buprestidae
Articles created by Qbugbot
Beetles described in 1824